In rhetoric, a climax (klîmax,  "staircase" or "ladder") is a figure of speech in which words, phrases, or clauses are arranged in order of increasing importance. In its use with clauses, it is also sometimes known as auxesis ( "growth").

Usage
Climax is frequently used in persuasion (particularly advertising) to create false dilemmas and to focus attention on the positive aspects of the subject at hand. The initial inferior options make the final term seem still better by comparison than it would appear in isolation: "X is good, Y is better, Z is best" is a standard format. It can also be used in reverse to make the initial term seem better by comparison: "A isn't perfect but B is worse and C is worst."

Examples
 From the First Letter to the Corinthians: "There are three things that will endure: faith, hope, and love. But the greatest of these is love."
 George Wald from A Generation in Search of a Future: "I think we've reached a point of great decision, not just for our nation, not only for all humanity, but for life upon the earth."
 William Shakespeare from The Passionate Pilgrim: "...Lost, vaded, broken, dead within an hour."
 William Shakespeare from Richard II: "...O'erthrows thy joys, friends, fortune and thy state"

Anticlimax
An anticlimax or anti-climax is an abrupt descent (either deliberate or unintended) on the part of a speaker or writer from the dignity of idea which he appeared to be aiming at, as in:

"The English poet Herrick expressed the same sentiment when he suggested that we should gather rosebuds while we may. Your elbow is in the butter, sir."

As a relative term, anticlimax requires a greater or lesser climax to precede it in order to have proper effect. An anticlimax can be intentionally employed only for a jocular or satiric purpose. It frequently partakes of the nature of antithesis, as in:

"Die and endow a college or a cat."

See also
 Figure of speech
 Bathos
 Climax as a narrative element

References

Citations

Sources 

 Baldrick, Chris. 2008. Oxford Dictionary of Literary Terms. Oxford University Press. New York. 
 Corbett, Edward P. J. and Connors, Robert J. 1999. Style and Statement. Oxford University Press. New York, Oxford. 
 Kennedy, X.J. et al. 2006. The Longman Dictionary of Literary Terms: Vocabulary for the Informed Reader. Pearson, Longman. New York. 
 Forsyth, Mark. 2014. The Elements of Eloquence. Berkley Publishing Group/Penguin Publishing. New York. 
 Quinn, Edward. 1999. A Dictionary of Literary and Thematic Terms. Checkmark Books. New York.

External links
  — 11th edition reprinted this article
 Video about the use of climax and anticlimax
 More figures of speech in video examples

Rhetoric
Figures of speech